Sarasa is a female name in Japanese. It is also an Indian name, being a shortened form of Saraswati.

Sarasa may refer to:
 Alphonse Antonio de Sarasa, a seventeenth-century mathematician
 Sarasa, the female protagonist of the manga Basara, authored by Tamura Yumi
 , a brand of gel pen sold by Japanese manufacturer ZEBRA since 2000.